GMDS may refer to:
GMDS (gene)
Generalized multidimensional scaling